
Gmina Myszyniec is an urban-rural gmina (administrative district) in Ostrołęka County, Masovian Voivodeship, in east-central Poland.

Villages
Apart from the town of Myszyniec, Gmina Myszyniec contains the villages and settlements of Białusny Lasek, Charciabałda, Cięćk, Drężek, Gadomskie, Krysiaki, Myszyniec-Koryta, Niedźwiedź, Olszyny, Pełty, Stary Myszyniec, Świdwiborek, Wolkowe, Wydmusy, Wykrot, Zalesie and Zdunek.

Neighbouring gminas
Gmina Myszyniec is bordered by the gminas of Baranowo, Czarnia, Kadzidło, Łyse and Rozogi.

References

Polish official population figures 2006

Myszyniec
Ostrołęka County